The Wild Dove (also known as The Wood Dove), Op. 110, B. 198 (1896), is the fourth orchestral poem composed by the Czech composer, Antonín Dvořák. Composed in October and November 1896, with a revision in January 1897, the premiere was given on 20 March 1898 in Brno under the baton of Leoš Janáček. The story is taken from the poem of the same name from Kytice, a collection of ballads by Karel Jaromír Erben. The four musical scenes describe the story of a woman who poisoned her husband and married another man shortly afterwards. A dove then sits on the grave of her dead husband and sings a sad song day after day. The wife feels guilty and commits suicide at the end by jumping and drowning in a river.

Synopsis
A young woman poisons her husband and feigns utter grief at his funeral. Her deception, however, cannot last long. She falls in love with a young man and, within a month, they are married in flamboyant style. One day a wild dove alights on the grave of the dead man and its piteous cooing constantly reminds the woman of her guilt. Finally, unable to bear the weight of her conscience, the murderess takes her own life.

References

External links
 

1896 compositions
Symphonic poems by Antonín Dvořák
Music based on European myths and legends
Adaptations of works by Karel Jaromír Erben